The Boggs Act of 1951 amended the Narcotic Drugs Import and Export Act and set mandatory sentences for drug convictions. A first offense conviction for marijuana possession carried a minimum sentence of 2 to 10 years and a fine of up to $20,000.

History
The act was sponsored by Hale Boggs, a  Louisiana Democrat. On November 2, 1951, Harry S. Truman signed the act into law.

On January 4, 1952, under the provisions of the act, over 500 were arrested.

References

1952 in law
1952 in the United States
82nd United States Congress
Cannabis law in the United States
Drug policy of the United States
History of drug control
United States federal controlled substances legislation
1952 in cannabis